The 1926 Ladies Open Championships was held at the Queen's Club, West Kensington in London from 14–19 December 1925. Cecily Fenwick won the title defeating Nancy Cave in the final. This championship was held in the 1925 but in the 1925/26 season so is attributed as being the 1926 event. Joyce Cave was unable to defend her title due to injury and the Times reported that due to her injury she was unable to train with her sister Nancy Cave which had a bearing on the result of the final.

Draw and results

Section A (round robin)

Section B (round robin)

Section C (round robin)

Section D (round robin)

Second round

Semi-finals

Final

References

Women's British Open Squash Championships
Women's British Open Squash Championships
Women's British Open Squash Championships
Squash competitions in London
British Open